Kamishak may refer to:

Places
Kamishak Bay on the coast of Alaska in the United States

Ships
USS Kamishak (AVP-44), a proposed United States Navy seaplane tender cancelled in 1943 before construction began